The Ragnar class was a class of three destroyers built for the Royal Swedish Navy before World War I. The class consisted of , , and . The lead ship, Ragnar, was launched May 30, 1908. The design was based on the earlier destroyer . The Ragnar class led a relatively quiet service life performing routine missions such as escorts and exercises between their commissioning before World War I and their decommissioning shortly after World War II.

References

Printed sources

 

 
Ships built in Malmö